This is a list of Kazakh football transfers in the winter transfer window 2016 by club. Only clubs of the 2016 Kazakhstan Premier League are included.

Kazakhstan Premier League 2016

Aktobe

In:

Out:

Akzhayik

In:

Out:

Astana

In:

Out:

Atyrau

In:

Out:

Irtysh

In:

Out:

Kairat

In:

Out:

Okzhetpes

In:

Out:

Ordabasy

In:

Out:

Shakhter Karagandy

In:

Out:

Taraz

In:

Out:

Tobol

In:

Out:

Zhetysu

In:

Out:

References

Kazakhstan
2016
Transfers